The 57th Scripps National Spelling Bee was held in Washington, D.C. at the Capital Hilton on May 30–31, 1984, sponsored by the E.W. Scripps Company.

The winner was 13-year-old Daniel Greenblatt of Sterling, Virginia, who correctly spelled "luge" for the win. Greenblatt was the first winner ever sponsored by a weekly newspaper, the Loudon Times-Mirror of Leesburg, Virginia. Second place went to 13-year-old Amy McWhirter of St. Joseph, Michigan, who missed "towhee".

There were 151 contestants this year (up from 137 the prior year), 78 girls and 73 boys. Fourth- to eighth-place spellers made it to the second day of competition. A total of 606 words were used.

The first-place winner received $1000. Alex Cameron was the pronouncer, in his fourth year in that role.

References

External links
 Final 45 seconds of 1984 bee, via NBC News Archives on YouTube

Scripps National Spelling Bee competitions
1984 in Washington, D.C.
1984 in education
May 1984 events in the United States